Chris Rörland (born 27 December 1986 in Sweden) is a Swedish metal guitarist and graphic designer. Before joining Sabaton in 2012, he played in TME and Nocturnal Rites.

Narrative 
Rörland started at the age of seven to play the guitar. He names Adrian Smith,  John Petrucci, Steve Vai and Yngwie Malmsteen as his major influences.

In 2010, Rörland became guitarist of the power metal band Nocturnal Rites. In 2012, he and Thorbjörn Englund replaced Sabaton's former guitarists, Rikard Sundén and Oskar Montelius. Rörland is in a relationship. He did his military service as a munition driver.

Together with Tommy Johansson, Thobbe Englund and Hannes Van Dahl, he is in the band "The Last Heroes".

Discography

Sabaton 
 2014: Heroes
 2016: The Last Stand
 2018: The Great War
 2022: The War to End All Wars

Guest 
 2008: with Cronan: Enterprise (lead guitar on tracks 3, 7, 8)
 2013: with Thobbe Englund: Fingerspitzengefühl in From the Wilderness (guitar solo)
 2017: with Nocturnal Rites: Before We Waste Away in Phoenix (song writer)
 2018: with Follow the Cipher: Follow the Cipher (lead and rhythm guitar)

Graphic designer 
 2015: for Thobbe Englund – From the Wilderness
 2016: for Sabaton – The Last Stand (text formation and layout)
 2016: for Thobbe Englund – Before the Storm
 2018: for Thobbe Englund – The Draining of Vergelmer (graphic design, text formation and layout)
 2018: for Follow the Cipher – Follow the Cipher
 2019: for Majestica - Above the Sky

External links 
 Rörland on Discogs

References 

Swedish heavy metal guitarists
Swedish graphic designers
1986 births
People from Falun
Living people